The Westlawn Institute of Marine Technology is a distance learning school of yacht design in Bath, Maine, United States, established in 1930. Graduates of the school receive the Westlawn Diploma in Naval Architecture, Marine Engineeering and Yacht Design.

The 320' three-masted schooner Eos was designed by Westlawn graduate Antonio Ferrer.

History 
Westlawn was founded in 1930 by boat designers E. S. Nelson and Gerald Taylor White. They named it Westlawn after the farm of White's in Montville, New Jersey.

The school was purchased in December 2014 by David Smyth, a Westlawn alumnus. It was formerly owned by the American Boat and Yacht Council.

Notable alumni 

 Tom Fexas
 Al Spalding

References

External links 

 

Design schools in the United States
Schools in Sagadahoc County, Maine
1930 establishments in Maine
Buildings and structures in Bath, Maine